The Levant Consular Service was a specialized British diplomatic organization centered in the Levant. From 1877 to 1916, it trained 88 Britons in consular service. The diplomatic arm spanned from the Balkans to China, mainly centering around the Ottoman Empire.

Origins 

During the 19th century the British foreign service consisted of the Victorian Consular Service, which was further divided into a General Service, a Far Eastern Service, and the Levant Service. Direct British diplomacy in the Levant dated back to 1825, when the Levant Company ceased operations. The British Diplomatic Service traditionally consuls for the Levant from expatriate British citizens living in the region (particularly those in Constantinople). The 1858 Select Committee on Foreign Office recommended reforming diplomacy in the Levant so that only Britons would serve as consuls. In order to find qualified individuals, they urged the creation of a program that would examine British subjects, specifically their aptitude for language, train them in Constantinople, and eventually use them as interpreters. Concerns over expenses of the program and whether it could attract qualified applicants delayed establishment until urging by Lord Salisbury led Philip Currie, 1st Baron Currie, to create it. The specialized Levant Consular Service was created in 1877.

Training program 
The Levant Consular Service consisted entirely of natural-born British citizens who were placed into the service based upon an exam intended to measure their knowledge of and aptitude for learning foreign languages. Once accepted into the service, the person, generally unmarried and 18 to 24 years old, would travel to Ortakeui ( away from the Ottoman Embassy) and be educated for two years (mainly in oriental languages). The students would then have to take an exam and, upon passing, were made assistant consuls and entered into the British diplomatic service. Graduates of the program could advance in the Diplomatic Service in Persia, Morocco, Greece, and the Ottoman Empire. Prospective members were examined in at least six languages, and committed to not leaving the service for five years after receiving an appointment.

The first exams were held over August and September 1877 and an initial class of six students entered into the program. Although in 1890 it was reported by a British commission that the service had "produced good results" and 26 Britons had joined the service, the school was soon closed because it was very expensive. In 1894, the program was restarted, but education in Ortakeui was replaced with two years of study at British universities, notably Cambridge, where E.G. Browne trained many students. It was written that the service produced consuls "as fully trained as any British public servant overseas". The training program ended in 1916, having recruited 88 consular officers. The Levant Consular program ended in 1936.

Diplomatic arm
The diplomatic arm of the service spanned from the Balkans to China, mainly centering around the Ottoman Empire. One of the service's main aims was to connect commercial agents with the consul. After the Russo-Turkish War, the position of 'military consul' was created and the consuls played a major role as mediators and peacekeepers.

References

Bibliography
 
 
 
 
 “The Selection, Instruction and Examination of the Student Interpreters of the Levant Consular Service 1877–1916.”
 
 
 

Diplomacy
Foreign relations of the United Kingdom
1877 establishments in the United Kingdom
Diplomatic services